"Poquito A Poquito" is a song by Dominican singer Henry Santos. It was released on May 2, 2011, and served as the first single for his debut album Introducing Henry Santos (2011). It also was his debut single as a solo artist. The music video was released on August 2, 2011.

Charts

References

2011 songs
2011 debut singles
Henry Santos songs
Universal Music Latin Entertainment singles